The 2008–09 FIS Ski Jumping World Cup was the 30th World Cup season in ski jumping and the 12th official World Cup season in ski flying. It began on 29 November 2008 at the Rukatunturi ski jumping hill in Kuusamo, Finland, and finished on 22 March 2009 at Planica, Slovenia.

The overall winner of the 2008/09 World Cup was Gregor Schlierenzauer of Austria, who won 13 of the 27 individual competitions, breaking Janne Ahonen's single-season record of 12 wins in a season. Schlierenzauer's 20 podiums in a single season is also a new record. Early leader Simon Ammann of Switzerland finished second in the overall standings, while Four Hills champion Wolfgang Loitzl of Austria finished third. Harri Olli of Finland finished fourth in the overall standings after a late-season run that gave him the first three World Cup wins of his career. Russia's Dimitry Vassiliev rounded out the top five, while defending champion Thomas Morgenstern of Austria finished in a, by his standards, disappointing 7th place overall, failing to win a single individual competition this season.

The Nations Cup, which is determined by adding all points gained by the participants of a country, in both individual and team competitions, was won overwhelmingly by Austria with 7331 points, more than three thousand points ahead of second-placed Finland (4270 points).

Lower competitive circuits this season included the Continental Cup and Grand Prix.

Calendar

Men

Men's team

Individual World Cup 
The jumper highlighted in yellow was the leader of the World Cup  at the time of the competition and wore the yellow jersey.
The jumper highlighted in azure was the leader of the Nordic Tournament  at the time of the competition and wore the blue jersey.
The jumper highlighted in gold was the leader of the Four Hills Tournament at the time of the competition and wore the gold jersey.

Kuusamo 

 HS142 Rukatunturi, Finland
29 November 2008

Notes:

 Thomas Morgenstern wore the yellow jersey as the reigning champion.

Trondheim 

 HS131 Granåsen, Norway
6 December 2008

Notes:
 Ville Larinto finished on the podium for the first time in his career.
 Gregor Schlierenzauer's jump of 140 meters is a new hill record (Anders Bardal's jump of 139.5 meters also broke the previous hill record).

 HS131 Granåsen, Norway
7 December 2008

Notes:
 Simon Ammann tied Gregor Schlierenzauer's hill record, set the day before.

Pragelato 

 HS140 Stadio del Trampolino, Italy
13 December 2008

Notes:
 Simon Ammann's jump of 144 meters is a new hill record.
 Gregor Schlierenzauer's 25th career podium finish.

 HS140 Stadio del Trampolino, Italy
14 December 2008

Notes:
 The second round was cancelled because of heavy snow.
 Fumihisa Yumoto's first career World Cup victory.
 Fumihisa Yumoto and Johan Remen Evensen finished on the podium for the first time in their careers.

Engelberg 

 HS137 Gross-Titlis-Schanze, Switzerland
20 December 2008

 HS137 Gross-Titlis-Schanze, Switzerland
21 December 2008

Notes:
 Simon Ammann's 25th career podium finish.

Four Hills Tournament

Oberstdorf 

 HS137 Schattenbergschanze, Germany
29 December 2008

Notes:
 Simon Ammann's first-ever victory in a Four Hills event.

Garmisch-Partenkirchen 

 HS140 Große Olympiaschanze, Germany
1 January 2009

Notes:
 Simon Amman was the leader of both the World Cup and the Four Hills Tournament. Due to him wearing the yellow World Cup-leader shirt, no one wore the golden FHT-leader shirt.
 Wolfgang Loitzl's first career World Cup victory, and his 10th podium finish.
 Harri Olli's first podium finish in the World Cup.

Innsbruck 

 HS130 Bergiselschanze, Austria
4 January 2009

Notes:
 World Cup leader Simon Ammann finished outside the top five for the first time this season.
 Martin Schmitt finished on the podium for the first time since 11 March 2007 at Lahti.

Bischofshofen 

 HS140 Paul-Ausserleitner-Schanze, Austria
6 January 2009

Notes:
 With his third straight victory, Wolfgang Loitzl secured overall victory in the 2008-09 Four Hills Tournament.

Tauplitz/Bad Mitterndorf  

 HS200 Kulm, Austria
10 January 2009

Notes:
 Gregor Schlierenzauer's jump of 215.5 meters is a new hill record at Kulm.

 HS200 Kulm, Austria
11 January 2009

Zakopane 

 HS134 Wielka Krokiew, Poland
16 January 2009

 HS134 Wielka Krokiew, Poland
17 January 2009

Whistler 

 HS140 Whistler Olympic Park, Canada
24 January 2009

Notes:
 Gregor Schlierenzauer set a new hill record at Whistler with his jump of 142.0 meters.
 Gregor Schlierenzauer also overtook Simon Ammann in the World Cup standings to gain the overall lead.
 Anders Jacobsen had the second-longest jump of the first round, but was disqualified for violating weight regulations.

 HS140 Whistler Olympic Park, Canada
25 January 2009

Notes:
 Gregor Schlierenzauer broke his hill record, set the day before, with a jump of 149.0 meters.
 Ville Larinto also jumped 149.0 meters, but fell – meaning his jump did not count as a hill record.
 Defending World Cup champion Thomas Morgenstern finished on the podium for the first time this season.

Sapporo 

 HS134 Mt. Okura Ski Jump Stadium, Japan
31 January 2009

Notes:
 Due to variable wind conditions, there were many short jumps in this competition.

 HS134 Mt. Okura Ski Jump Stadium, Japan
1 February 2009
Competition cancelled due to strong winds and heavy snow.

Willingen 

 HS145 Mühlenkopfschanze, Germany
8 February 2009

Notes:
 Gregor Schlierenzauer's 20th career World Cup victory.
 Noriaki Kasai finished on the podium for the first time since 1 January 2007 at Garmisch-Partenkirchen and is also the oldest jumper to reach a world cup podium, aged 36.

Klingenthal 

 HS140 Vogtlandarena, Germany
11 February 2009

Oberstdorf  

 HS213 Heini-Klopfer-Skiflugschanze, Germany
14 February 2009

Notes:
 Harri Olli's first career World Cup victory. His jump of 225.5 meters is also a new hill record.

Nordic Ski World Championship 

The Nordic Ski World Championship was held between 18 February and 1 March 2009 in Liberec, Czech Republic. It does not count in the World Cup standings.

Nordic Tournament

Lahti 

 HS130 HS97 Salpausselkä, Finland
8 March 2009

Notes:
 Due to poor wind conditions the competition was moved to the Normal hill.

Kuopio 

 HS127 Puijo, Finland
10 March 2009

 As both World Cup leader and Nordic Tournament leader, Gregor Schlierenzauer wore only the yellow jersey.
 Takanobu Okabe's 5th World Cup victory and his first since 1 March 1998, at Vikersund.
 Adam Małysz' 75th career podium finish, and his first since 25 March 2007, at Planica.

Lillehammer 

 HS138 Lysgårdsbakken, Norway
13 March 2009

Vikersund  

 HS207 Vikersundbakken, Norway
15 March 2009

Gregor Schlierenzauer secured overall victory in the World Cup with two more events to go.
Schlierenzauer also won this year's Nordic Tournament, ahead of Harri Olli and Simon Ammann.
This was Schlierenzauer's 12th win of the season, equaling Janne Ahonen's record for wins in a single season, set in 2004–05.
Schlierenzauer also finished on the podium for the 19th time this season, breaking Martin Schmitt's record for most podiums in a single season.

Planica  

 HS215 Letalnica, Slovenia
20 March 2009

Notes:
 The second round of the competition was cancelled due to unstable wind conditions and falling dusk.
 Gregor Schlierenzauer won his 13th competition of the season, which is a new single-season record.

 HS215 Letalnica, Slovenia
22 March 2009

Overall Top 20 (individual)

Key

 1: Kuusamo (29 November 2008)
 2: Trondheim (6 December 2008)
 3: Trondheim (7 December 2008)
 4: Pragelato (13 December 2008)
 5: Pragelato (14 December 2008)
 6: Engelberg (20 December 2008)
 7: Engelberg (21 December 2008)
 8: Oberstdorf (29 December 2008)
 9: Garmisch-Partenkirchen (1 January 2009)
 10: Innsbruck (4 January 2009)
 11: Bischofshofen (6 January 2009)
 12: Tauplitz (10 January 2009)
 13: Tauplitz (11 January 2009)
 14: Zakopane (16 January 2009)
 15: Zakopane (17 January 2009)
 16: Whistler (24 January 2009)
 17: Whistler (25 January 2009)
 18: Sapporo (31 January 2009)
 19: Willingen (8 February 2009)
 20: Klingenthal (11 February 2009)
 21: Oberstdorf (14 February 2009)
 22: Lahti (8 March 2009)
 23: Kuopio (10 March 2009)
 24: Lillehammer (13 March 2009)
 25: Vikersund (15 March 2009)
 26: Planica (20 March 2009)
 27: Planica (22 March 2009)

Team World Cup

Kuusamo 

 HS142 Rukatunturi, Finland
29 November 2008

Notes:

 The competition was scheduled to take place on 28 November, but was moved to the day after due to bad weather. The team event was held after the individual event. Because there was much delay in the individual event and some time concerns by the officials, only one run was competed in the team event.

FIS Team Tour 
The FIS Team Tour was held between 7 February and 15 February 2009. The results of this competition is determined by adding the overall points totals gained in the team competitions at Willingen and Oberstdorf, and also adding the two best individual scores for each nation in the individual events at Willingen, Klingenthal and Oberstdorf to the final combined score.

Norway won the Team Tour, with an overall score of 4083.8 points. Austria finished second with 4032.2 points, while Finland took third place with a combined score of 3960.4 points.

Willingen 

 HS145 Mühlenkopfschanze, Germany
7 February 2009

Notes:

 World Cup leader Gregor Schlierenzauer did not participate for the Austrian team.

Oberstdorf  

 HS213 Heini-Klopfer-Skiflugschanze, Germany
15 February 2009

Lahti 

 HS130 Salpausselkä, Finland
7 March 2009

Vikersund  

 HS207 Vikersundbakken, Norway
14 March 2009

 Harri Olli equalled the hill record of 219.0 m set in 2004 by Austrian Roland Müller in a Continental Cup event. Olli's jump is the longest-ever at Vikersund in a World Cup event.
 Gregor Schlierenzauer jumped further than the hill record at 224.0 m but because he fell it does not count as an official hill record.

Planica  

 HS215 Letalnica, Slovenia
21 March 2009

Notes
 The second round was cancelled due to strong wind.

References
 World Cup standings, from fis-ski.com

World cup
World cup
FIS Ski Jumping World Cup